Carthage ( or ) was the capital city of Ancient Carthage, and is currently an archaeological site near Tinis, Tunisia.

Carthage or Carthago may also refer to:

 Ancient Carthage

Places

United States 
 Carthage, Arkansas
  Carthage, California, a.k.a. Cartago, California
 Carthage, Illinois
 Carthage, Indiana
 Carthage, Maine
 Carthage, Mississippi
 Carthage, Missouri
 Carthage, New York
 Carthage, North Carolina
 Carthage, Ohio (disambiguation), multiple places
 Carthage, South Dakota
 Carthage, Tennessee
 Carthage, Texas
 Carthage Lake, Illinois
 South Carthage, Tennessee
 West Carthage, New York

Elsewhere 
 Carthage (episcopal see), the city restored to importance by Julius Caesar and Augustus
 Carthage, Ontario, Canada
 Carthago, Sudan
 Tunis–Carthage International Airport, in Tunis, Tunisia

People 
 Five Martyrs of Carthage, Felix of Thibiuca, Audactus, Fortunatus, Januarius, and Septimus, all martyred during the Great Persecution under the Roman emperor Diocletian
 Saint Carthage the Elder, also known as Carthach
 Saint Carthage the Younger, also known as Carthage of Lismore or Mochuda ("My Carthage")

Arts, entertainment, and media
 Carthage, novel by Ross Leckie
 Carthage, novel by Joyce Carol Oates
 Carthage, a portion of fictional virtual world in television animation series Code Lyoko

Military

At Carthage in North Africa 
 Battle of Carthage (c. 149 BC) (Punic), Carthaginians vs. Romans
 Battle of Carthage (238), in civil war among Romans
 Battle of Carthage (533), a.k.a. Battle of Ad Decimum, Vandals vs. Byzantines
 Battle of Carthage (698), Byzantines vs. Arabs

Other engagements 
 Battle of Carthage (1861), in American Civil War
 Operation Carthage (1945), air raid on Copenhagen

Other uses
 Carthage College in Kenosha, Wisconsin
 Carthage Jail, in Illinois where Joseph Smith, Jr. was murdered
 Councils of Carthage, theological events in between 251-525 CE

See also
 Cartagena (disambiguation)
 Cartago (disambiguation)